Jhonny Lucas Flora Barbosa (born 21 February 2000), commonly known as Jhonny Lucas, is a Brazilian footballer who plays as a midfielder for Goiás.

Club career
On 21 August 2019 he signed with Belgian First Division A club Sint-Truiden.

Career statistics

Club

Notes

References

2000 births
Living people
Brazilian footballers
Brazilian expatriate footballers
Brazil youth international footballers
Association football midfielders
Campeonato Brasileiro Série B players
Campeonato Brasileiro Série A players
Belgian Pro League players
Campeonato Paranaense players
Paraná Clube players
Sint-Truidense V.V. players
Londrina Esporte Clube players
Brazilian expatriate sportspeople in Belgium
Expatriate footballers in Belgium
Footballers from Curitiba